Howard Finster (December 2, 1916 – October 22, 2001) was an American artist and Baptist minister from Georgia. He claimed to be inspired by God to spread the gospel through the design of his swampy land into Paradise Garden, a folk art sculpture garden with over 46,000 pieces of art. His creations include outsider art, naïve art, and visionary art. Finster came to widespread notice in the 1980s with his album cover designs for R.E.M. and Talking Heads.

Early life
Finster was born at Valley Head, Alabama, to Samuel and Lula Finster, and lived on the family farm as one of 13 children. He attended school from age six into the sixth grade. He said he had his first vision at the age of three years, when he saw his recently deceased sister Abbie Rose walking down out of the sky wearing a white gown. She told him, "Howard, you're gonna be a man of visions."

He became "born again" at a Baptist revival at the age of 13 and began to preach at 16. He gave the occasional sermon at local churches and wrote articles for the town newspaper, and became a full-time pastor at Rock Bridge Baptist Church in 1940. He later served at the Mount Carmel Baptist Church in Fort Payne, Alabama, shortly before venturing into full-time art.

Artistic works
Finster began building his first garden park museum in Trion, Georgia, in the late 1940s. It featured an exhibit on the inventions of mankind in which Finster planned to display one of everything that had ever been invented, models of houses and churches, a pigeon flock and a duck pond.

When he ran out of land in Trion in 1961, he moved to Pennville, Georgia, near Summerville, and bought  of land upon which to build the Plant Farm Museum "to show all the wonderful things o' God's Creation, kinda like the Garden of Eden." It features such attractions as the "Bible House," "the Mirror House," "the Hubcap Tower," "the Bicycle Tower," "the Machine Gun Nest," and the largest structure in the garden, the five-story "Folk Art Chapel." He also started putting up signs with Bible verses on them because "he felt that they stuck in people's heads better that way."

He retired from preaching in 1965 and focused all of his time on improving the Plant Farm Museum. In 1976, he had another vision to paint sacred art. According to Finster, "...one day I was workin' on a patch job on a bicycle, and I was rubbin' some white paint on that patch with this finger here, and I looked at the round tip o' my finger, and there was a human face on it... then a warm feelin' come over my body, and a voice spoke to me and said, 'Paint sacred art.'"

His diverse range of subjects include pop culture icons like Elvis Presley, historical figures like George Washington, Ronald Reagan, religious images like The Devils Vice and "John the Baptist," UFOs and aliens, war and politics. His paintings are colorful and detailed; they use flat picture plane without perspective and are often covered with words, especially Bible verses. Every painting also has a number: God had asked him to do 5,000 paintings to spread the gospel and Finster wanted to keep track.

He finished the 5,000 a few days before Christmas in 1985, but continued painting and numbering until the day he died. By 1989, he was already numbering in the ten thousands.

He first started receiving outside publicity in 1975. That year, Atlanta-based WAGA ran a story; he also appeared in an Esquire magazine article that first dubbed his museum Paradise Garden. He made his first exhibition appearance in 1976 and painted four paintings for the Library of Congress in 1977. He was also selected to be part of the Venice Biennale in 1984.  Several of Finster's pieces are on display at the Smithsonian American Art Museum in Washington, D.C.

Finster gained national fame after his collaborative work with Athens, Georgia-based rock band R.E.M. The group filmed the video for the group's debut single "Radio Free Europe" in Finster's Paradise Gardens in 1983.  The following year, the band's singer Michael Stipe and Finster collaborated on a painting for the cover of their second album Reckoning. After that the band made the song "Maps and Legends" (in its third album Fables of the Reconstruction) as an homage to Finster. Along with R.E.M., Finster also appeared in the documentary film Athens, GA: Inside Out, filmed in 1985, in which he tells the story of how he came to be an artist. Finster (and his art) also appears in the band's video for Radio Free Europe.

The band Talking Heads commissioned a Finster painting for Little Creatures in 1985 that was subsequently selected as album cover of the year by Rolling Stone magazine. Other artists to use Finster as an album cover designer include Memory Dean, Pierce Pettis, and Adam Again. In 1994, a portion of his Paradise Garden was installed as part of the permanent collection of Atlanta's High Museum. Bill Mallonee of the Vigilantes of Love (also a Christian from Athens, Georgia) wrote a song inspired by Finster's artwork called The Glory and the Dream in 1994.

Howard Finster was responsible for introducing millions to outsider art, but even with his fame, he remained focused on religious outreach. He said of the Talking Heads album, "I think there's twenty-six religious verses on that first cover I done for them. They sold a million records in the first two and a half months after it come out, so that's twenty-six million verses I got out into the world in two and a half months!"

The classification of his creations overlap folk art and outsider art for the origin, naïve art and visionary art for the content.

Notes

References
Beal, T. (Timothy Beal) (2005). "Folk Art Church: Paradise Gardens," in Roadside Religion: In Search of the Sacred, the Strange, and the Substance of Faith. Beacon Press.
Finster, Howard and Patterson, Tom. (1989). Stranger From Another World: Man of Visions Now on This Earth. Abbeville Press. .
Turner, J.F. (1989). Howard Finster: Man of Visions. Alfred A. Knopf. .
Turner, J.F. "Howard Finster: Man of Visions",  The Clarion, Fall 1989.
Peacock, Robert (1996). Paradise Garden: A Trip Through Howard Finster’s Visionary World, Chronicle Books. . .

External links

 official website for Rev. Howard Finster's Paradise Garden Foundation
 website for the Howard Finster Vision House Museum
"Mind on Heaven" audio recording with the Shaking Ray Levis, 1987
Howard Finster article, Encyclopedia of Alabama
 A Masters thesis which details the life of Finster and five other visionary environmental artists.
 Article on Finster's Paradise, Raw Vision Issue 35
Thesis on Salvation-Themed Visionary Art

1916 births
2001 deaths
People from DeKalb County, Alabama
Folk artists
Naïve painters
Georgia (U.S. state) culture
Artists from Georgia (U.S. state)
Painters from Alabama
People from Chattooga County, Georgia
20th-century American painters
American male painters
Album-cover and concert-poster artists
Southern art
Baptists from Alabama
20th-century Baptist ministers from the United States
20th-century American male artists
Outsider artists
Visionary artists